Three Lederhosen in St. Tropez is a 1980 West German sex comedy film directed by Franz Marischka and starring Peter Steiner, Fred Stillkrauth and Mario Pollak.

Cast
 Peter Steiner as Peter Eichel
 Fred Stillkrauth as Korbinian Zangerl
 Mario Pollak as Paloma
 Eleonore Melzer as Marta Eichel
 Franz Muxeneder as Huber-Bauer
 Alexandra Beau as Evi
 Hermann Giefer as Vitus
 Ursula Buchfellner as Carla
 Sibylle Rauch as Blondine
 Rolf Eden as Papilein
 Peter Steiner Jr. as Briefträger
 Jacques Herlin as Französischer Polizeichef
 Rosl Mayr as Alte Millionärin
 Bob Lockwood as Transvestit Karlchen
 Toni Netzle as Frau Klein
 Christiane Blumhoff as Journalistin
 Loisl Wille as Französischer Polizist
 Felix Paul as Musikant
 Marshall Reynor as Musikant
 Egon Keresztes as Französischer Polizist
 Fritz Wallenwein as Französischer Polizist
 Sascha Atzenbeck as Liebespaar am Strand
 Alon D'Armand as Hotelmanager
 Franz Marischka as Chef des Autohauses
 Margit Ojetz as Liebespaar am Strand
 Claus Sasse as Autoverkäufer

References

Bibliography

External links 
 

1980 films
West German films
German sex comedy films
1980s sex comedy films
1980s German-language films
Films directed by Franz Marischka
Films set on the French Riviera
1980 comedy films
1980s German films